Felipe Aguilar Mendoza (born 20 January 1993) is a Colombian professional footballer who plays as a centre-back for Lanús, on loan from Brazilian club Athletico Paranaense.

Club career

Atlético Nacional
Aguilar was born in Medellín, and joined Atlético Nacional's youth setup at the age of 12. On 23 March 2011, while still a youth, he made his first team debut by starting in a 2–0 away loss against Deportivo Rionegro, for the year's Copa Colombia.

In January 2013, after finishing his formation, Aguilar moved to fellow Categoría Primera A side Alianza Petrolera on loan. He made his professional debut on 16 February, starting in a 4–0 away loss against his parent club.

Aguilar scored his first professional goal on 10 April 2013, his team's third in a 4–0 away rout of Cúcuta Deportivo, for the national cup. He then became a regular starter at Alianza before returning to Nacional in January 2016. Initially a backup to Alexis Henríquez and Davinson Sánchez, he became a regular starter after Sánchez's departure to Ajax.

Santos
On 15 January 2019, Atlético Nacional announced that they had accepted an offer from Santos for Aguilar. Three days later, he was officially announced as the club's second signing of the season, after agreeing to a four-year contract.

Aguilar made his debut for the club on 27 January 2019, replacing Jean Mota in a 2–0 Campeonato Paulista home win against São Paulo. His first goal abroad came on 7 March, as he scored the last in a 4–0 home win over América-RN, for the year's Copa do Brasil.

Initially a first-choice, Aguilar was demoted to fourth-choice in September 2019 (behind Gustavo Henrique, Lucas Veríssimo and new signing Luan Peres), mainly due to individual errors.

Athletico Paranaense
On 18 March 2020, Aguilar agreed to a four-year contract with fellow top tier side Athletico Paranaense,  for a rumoured fee of R$ 10 million for 50% of his federative rights.

International career
Aguilar represented Colombia at under-20 level in the 2013 South American Youth Football Championship and the 2013 FIFA U-20 World Cup. On 23 May 2016, he was included in José Pékerman's 23-man list for the Copa América Centenario.

Aguilar made his full international debut on 11 June 2016, starting in a 3–2 loss against Costa Rica at the NRG Stadium in Houston. In that year, he also represented the under-23s, being initially named for the 2016 Summer Olympics but being cut from the final squad due to injury.

Career statistics

Club

International

Honours

Club
Atlético Nacional
 Superliga Colombiana: 2016
 Copa Libertadores: 2016
 Recopa Sudamericana: 2017

International
Colombia U20
 South American Youth Football Championship: 2013

Colombia
 Copa América: Third place 2016

References

External links
 
 

1993 births
Living people
Colombian footballers
Colombian expatriate footballers
Colombia international footballers
Olympic footballers of Colombia
Footballers from Medellín
Colombia under-20 international footballers
Copa América Centenario players
Footballers at the 2016 Summer Olympics
Association football defenders
Atlético Nacional footballers
Alianza Petrolera players
Santos FC players
Club Athletico Paranaense players
Club Atlético Lanús footballers
Categoría Primera A players
Campeonato Brasileiro Série A players
Argentine Primera División players
Colombian expatriate sportspeople in Brazil
Colombian expatriate sportspeople in Argentina
Expatriate footballers in Brazil
Expatriate footballers in Argentina